The Republic of Rwanda is a small landlocked sovereign country located in the Great Lakes region of east-central Africa, bordered by Uganda, Burundi, the Democratic Republic of the Congo and Tanzania. Home to approximately 10.1 million people, Rwanda supports the densest population in continental Africa, with most of the population engaged in subsistence agriculture. A verdant country of fertile and hilly terrain, the small republic bears the title "Land of a Thousand Hills".  The country attracted international concern for the infamous Rwandan genocide of 1994.

The following outline is provided as an overview of and topical guide to Rwanda:

General reference 

 Pronunciation:  or 
 Common English country name(s): Rwanda
 Official English country name(s): of Rwanda
 Common endonym(s):  
 Official endonym(s):  
 Adjectival(s): Rwandan
 Demonym(s):
 International rankings of Rwanda
 ISO country codes:  RW, RWA, 646
 ISO region codes:  See ISO 3166-2:RW
 Internet country code top-level domain:  .rw

Geography of Rwanda 

 Rwanda is: a landlocked country
 Location:
 Southern Hemisphere and Eastern Hemisphere
 Africa
 Central Africa
 East Africa
 Time zone:  Central Africa Time (UTC+02)
 Extreme points of Rwanda
 High:  Mount Karisimbi 
 Low:  Ruzizi River 
 Land boundaries:  893 km
 290 km
 217 km
 217 km
 169 km
 Coastline:  none
 Population of Rwanda: 9,725,000  – 82nd most populous country

 Area of Rwanda: 26,798 km2
 Atlas of Rwanda

Environment of Rwanda 

 Climate of Rwanda
 Ecoregions in Rwanda
 Geology of Rwanda
 Wildlife of Rwanda
 Fauna of Rwanda
 Birds of Rwanda
 Mammals of Rwanda

Natural geographic features of Rwanda 

 Glaciers in Rwanda: none
 Lakes of Rwanda
 Mountains of Rwanda
 Volcanoes in Rwanda
 Rivers of Rwanda
 World Heritage Sites in Rwanda: None

Regions of Rwanda 

Regions of Rwanda

Ecoregions of Rwanda 

List of ecoregions in Rwanda
 Ecoregions in Rwanda

Administrative divisions of Rwanda 

Administrative divisions of Rwanda
 Provinces of Rwanda
 Districts of Rwanda

Provinces of Rwanda 

Provinces of Rwanda

Districts of Rwanda 

Districts of Rwanda

Demography of Rwanda 

Demographics of Rwanda

Government and politics of Rwanda 

Politics of Rwanda
 Form of government:
 Capital of Rwanda: Kigali
 Elections in Rwanda
 Political parties in Rwanda

Branches of the government of Rwanda 

Government of Rwanda

Executive branch of the government of Rwanda 
 Head of state: President of Rwanda,
 Head of government: Prime Minister of Rwanda,
 Cabinet of Rwanda

Legislative branch of the government of Rwanda 

 Parliament of Rwanda (bicameral)
 Upper house: Senate of Rwanda
 Lower house: House of Commons of Rwanda

Judicial branch of the government of Rwanda 

Court system of Rwanda
 Supreme Court of Rwanda

Foreign relations of Rwanda 

Foreign relations of Rwanda
 Diplomatic missions in Rwanda
 Diplomatic missions of Rwanda

International organization membership 
The Republic of Rwanda is a member of:

African, Caribbean, and Pacific Group of States (ACP)
African Development Bank Group (AfDB)
African Union (AU)
African Union/United Nations Hybrid operation in Darfur (UNAMID)
Common Market for Eastern and Southern Africa (COMESA)
Commonwealth of Nations (C)
East African Community (EAC)
East African Development Bank (EADB)
Economic Community of the Great Lakes Countries (CEPGL)
Food and Agriculture Organization (FAO)
Group of 77 (G77)
International Atomic Energy Agency (IAEA)
International Bank for Reconstruction and Development (IBRD)
International Civil Aviation Organization (ICAO)
International Criminal Police Organization (Interpol)
International Development Association (IDA)
International Federation of Red Cross and Red Crescent Societies (IFRCS)
International Finance Corporation (IFC)
International Fund for Agricultural Development (IFAD)
International Labour Organization (ILO)
International Monetary Fund (IMF)
International Olympic Committee (IOC)
International Organization for Migration (IOM)
International Organization for Standardization (ISO) (correspondent)
International Red Cross and Red Crescent Movement (ICRM)

International Telecommunication Union (ITU)
International Telecommunications Satellite Organization (ITSO)
International Trade Union Confederation (ITUC)
Inter-Parliamentary Union (IPU)
Multilateral Investment Guarantee Agency (MIGA)
Nonaligned Movement (NAM)
Organisation internationale de la Francophonie (OIF)
Organisation for the Prohibition of Chemical Weapons (OPCW)
Permanent Court of Arbitration (PCA)
United Nations (UN)
United Nations Conference on Trade and Development (UNCTAD)
United Nations Educational, Scientific, and Cultural Organization (UNESCO)
United Nations High Commissioner for Refugees (UNHCR)
United Nations Industrial Development Organization (UNIDO)
United Nations Interim Security Force for Abyei (UNISFA)
United Nations Mission in the Central African Republic and Chad (MINURCAT)
United Nations Mission in the Sudan (UNMIS)
United Nations Multidimensional Integrated Stabilization Mission in Mali (MINUSMA)
Universal Postal Union (UPU)
World Confederation of Labour (WCL)
World Customs Organization (WCO)
World Federation of Trade Unions (WFTU)
World Health Organization (WHO)
World Intellectual Property Organization (WIPO)
World Meteorological Organization (WMO)
World Tourism Organization (UNWTO)
World Trade Organization (WTO)

Law and order in Rwanda 

Law of Rwanda
 Constitution of Rwanda
 Human rights in Rwanda
 LGBT rights in Rwanda
 Law enforcement in Rwanda

Military of Rwanda 

Military of Rwanda
 Command
 Commander-in-chief:
 Ministry of Defence of Rwanda
 Forces
 Army of Rwanda
 Navy of Rwanda: None
 Air Force of Rwanda

Local government in Rwanda 

Local government in Rwanda

History of Rwanda 

History of Rwanda
Current events of Rwanda
 Great Lakes refugee crisis
 Kingdom of Rwanda
 Kings of Rwanda
 Rwandan Civil War
 Rwandan genocide

Culture of Rwanda 

Culture of Rwanda
 Cuisine of Rwanda
 Languages of Rwanda
 Media in Rwanda
 National symbols of Rwanda
 Coat of arms of Rwanda
 Flag of Rwanda
 National anthem of Rwanda
 Prostitution in Rwanda
 Public holidays in Rwanda
 Religion in Rwanda
 Hinduism in Rwanda
 Islam in Rwanda
 Sikhism in Rwanda
 World Heritage Sites in Rwanda: None

Art in Rwanda 
 Literature of Rwanda
 Music of Rwanda

Sports in Rwanda 

Sports in Rwanda
 Football in Rwanda
 Rwanda at the Olympics

Economy and infrastructure of Rwanda 

Economy of Rwanda
 Economic rank, by nominal GDP (2007): 148th (one hundred and forty eighth)
 Banking in Rwanda
 National Bank of Rwanda
 Communications in Rwanda
 Internet in Rwanda
 Companies of Rwanda
Currency of Rwanda: Franc
ISO 4217: RWF
 Energy in Rwanda
 Health care in Rwanda
 Mining in Rwanda
 Rwanda Stock Exchange
 Tourism in Rwanda
 Transport in Rwanda
 Airports in Rwanda
 Rail transport in Rwanda
 Water supply and sanitation in Rwanda

Education in Rwanda 

Education in Rwanda

See also 

Rwanda
Index of Rwanda-related articles
List of Rwanda-related topics
List of international rankings
Member state of the United Nations
Outline of Africa
Outline of geography

References

External links 

 The Republic of Rwanda official government site
 Miss Rwanda presents Rwanda's Lake Kivu
 Rwanda Travel Information
 IRIN News for Rwanda, from the United Nations
 CIA World Factbook — Rwanda
 
 News, documentation and history of Rwanda seen by young rwandese
 Photos of Rwanda
 Rwanda Safaris Guide
 Rwanda Online Guide
 National Geographic Journalist Kira Salak's 2006 Article  "PLACES OF DARKNESS" appearing in National Geographic Adventure
 Photos from National Geographic Journalist Kira Salak's 2006 Article "PLACES OF DARKNESS"  appearing in National Geographic Adventure

Rwanda
 1